Squaliobarbinae is a small subfamily of the carp and minnow family, Cyprinidae, which consists of three monotypic genera which have their natural distributions in eastern Asia. Two species, the grass carp (Ctenopharyngodon idella) and the black carp (Mylopharyngodon piceus), have been introduced to other parts of the world for weed control and aquaculture. They are large cyprinids characterised by an enlarged subtemporal fossa, the palate articulating with the supraethmoid, an enlarged intercalar bone in the cranial vault, and a divided levator posterior muscle.

Genera
The three genera that make up the subfamily Squaliobarbinae are:

Taxonomy
Cyprinids are a large, widespread, and diverse family of mainly freshwater ray-finned fishes, and the taxonomy of the family has not yet been fully resolved. Fishbase recognises the Squaliobarbinae as a valid subfamily, but recent studies suggest that this may not necessarily be the case. For example, the three genera of this subfamily have been placed in the larger subfamily Oxygasterinae, and Squaliobarbinae is listed as a synonym of Oxygasterinae. and the World Register of Marine Species treats all three taxa traditionally placed in the Squaliobarbinae as incertae sedis. while the Catalog of Fishes places them in the subfamily Xenocyprinae. However, at whatever level they are classified the three squaliobarbine taxa appear to be closely related and to form a clade. and have been referred to as the tribe Squaliobarbini.

References

 
Fish subfamilies